Van Biesbroeck is a small lunar impact crater that interrupts the southern rim of the lava-flooded crater Krieger, in the Oceanus Procellarum. The crater is circular and symmetrical, with sloping inner walls that run down to a small interior floor. Van Biesbroeck was designated Krieger B before the IAU gave it a unique name.

See also 
 1781 Van Biesbroeck, minor planet

References 

 
 
 
 
 
 
 
 
 
 
 
 

Impact craters on the Moon